Huayruro Punco (possibly from Quechua wayruru cockspur coral tree, punku servant; door, entrance, p'unqu pond, reservoir, tank; dam, Aymara wayruru red and black seeds of a plant (Abrus precatorius, Ormosia coccinea and Ormosia minor); also meaning something very beautiful, punqu door, pünqu (ü stand for a long u) a heap of little stones,) is a mountain in the Vilcanota mountain range in the Andes of Peru, about  high. It is situated in the Cusco Region, Canchis Province, Pitumarca District. Huayruro Punco lies southeast of Callangate, southwest of Chumpe and north of Cóndor Tuco and Comercocha, between the Chillcamayu which originates near Huayruro Punco and the lake named Sibinacocha.

See also 
 Yanajaja

References

Mountains of Peru
Mountains of Cusco Region